NOC or Noc may refer to:

Organizations 
 Ireland West Airport Knock, Ireland (IATA code)
 Nantahala Outdoor Center, a river outfitter in western North Carolina
 National Oceanography Centre (NOC), UK
 National Oceanography Centre, Liverpool (NOCL), UK, see Proudman Oceanographic Laboratory
 National Oceanography Centre, Southampton (NOCS), UK
 National oil company (NOC)
 National Oil Corporation the national oil company of Libya
 National Olympic Committee, a group eligible to enter athletes and teams into an Olympic Games
 Nippon Oil Corporation, a Japanese company, see Eneos
 North Oil Company, an Iraqi oil company
 North Oil Company (Qatar), a Qatari oil company
 Northeast Ohio Conference, a high school athletics conference
 Northern Oklahoma College, a community college located in Tonkawa, Oklahoma
 Northrop Grumman, its stock symbol
 Night Owl Cinematics, a production company based in Singapore

Computer/technology terms 
 Network on a chip, a term in electronic system design
 Network operations center, a computer networking term

Other uses 
 National Occupational Classification, a Canadian classification system of occupations
 No Objection Certificate
 No overall control, a UK political term
 Noć, a village in Poland
 NOC (whale), a beluga whale known for imitating human vocalizations
 Non-official cover, an espionage and intelligence term, for covert and presumably un-tied operatives 
 Nursing Outcomes Classification
 WWE Night of Champions, a WWE pay per view

See also 
 NOK (disambiguation)
 Nock (disambiguation)